Survivor 44 is the forty-fourth season of the American competitive reality television series Survivor. This season, filmed from June 5 through June 30, 2022, is the twelfth consecutive season to be filmed in the Mamanuca Islands in Fiji. It premiered on March 1, 2023, on CBS in the United States, and on Global in Canada.

Production 
CBS renewed Survivor for its forty-third and forty-fourth seasons on March 9, 2022. As with every season since season 41, Survivor 44 features 26 days of gameplay, pitting eighteen contestants against one another in three initial tribes. Filming began in June 5, 2022 and concluded on June 30, 2022.

Contestants
The cast was announced on January 31, 2023, and consists of 18 new players divided into three tribes: Ratu, Soka, and Tika. Among the contestants is former Seattle Seahawks fullback Brandon Cottom.

Season summary

Episodes

Voting history

References

External links 
 

43
2023 American television seasons
2022 in Fiji
Television shows filmed in Fiji
Television shows set in Fiji